Nogometni klub Komenda, commonly referred to as NK Komenda or simply Komenda, is a Slovenian football club from Komenda. The club was established in 1957.

Honours
Slovenian Third League
 Winners: 1999–2000

Regional Ljubljana League
 Winners: 2013–14

Slovenian Fifth Division
 Winners: 1992–93

References

External links
Official website 

Football clubs in Slovenia
Association football clubs established in 1957
1957 establishments in Slovenia